Jon Nicholas Willhite (January 27, 1941 – December 14, 2008) was an American professional baseball player, a left-handed pitcher. Born in Tulsa, Oklahoma, Willhite grew up in Denver, Colorado and graduated from South High School in 1959. He was signed by the Los Angeles Dodgers in 1959 and was called up to Major League Baseball in 1963 and pitched from 1963 to 1967 for the Dodgers, Washington Senators, California Angels and New York Mets.

Willhite was with the Dodgers when they won the 1965 World Series, but he did not pitch in the series. He was out of baseball by age 26, with an overall record of 6–12 and a 4.55 ERA.

Willhite later worked as a pitching coach at Brigham Young University and in the Milwaukee Brewers and New York Yankees organizations.

He struggled in post-baseball life. Willhite was married and divorced three times, eventually living on the streets of Salt Lake City as a drug and alcohol addict. He reached out to another former Dodger pitcher, Stan Williams, for help.  He ultimately received that help from the Baseball Assistance Team, which assists former baseball players in need. Willhite entered a treatment center in 1989 and later became an addictions counselor.

Willhite died of cancer at his son's home in Alpine, Utah.

References

External links
, or Retrosheet, or Pura Pelota (Venezuelan Winter League)

1941 births
2008 deaths
Albuquerque Dukes players
Baseball players from Oklahoma
BYU Cougars baseball coaches
California Angels players
Deaths from cancer in Utah
Denver Bears players
Greenville Spinners players
Jacksonville Suns players
Los Angeles Dodgers players
Major League Baseball pitchers
Minor league baseball coaches
Navegantes del Magallanes players
American expatriate baseball players in Venezuela
New York Mets players
Northern Colorado Bears baseball players
Omaha Dodgers players
Omaha Royals players
Reno Silver Sox players
San Antonio Missions players
Spokane Indians players
Sportspeople from Tulsa, Oklahoma
Tacoma Cubs players
Tulsa Oilers (baseball) players
Washington Senators (1961–1971) players